Charles Drew may refer to:

 Charles R. Drew (1904–1950), American physician, surgeon, and medical researcher
 Charles Drew (cricketer) (1888–1960), Australian cricketer
 Charles Drew (surgeon) (1916–1987), cardiothoracic surgeon
 Charles S. Drew (1825–1886), representative in the legislature of the Oregon Territory of the United States 
 USNS Charles Drew (T-AKE-10), a 2010 Lewis and Clark-class dry cargo ship of the United States Navy
 Charles John Drew (c. 1690–1740), English lawyer murdered in Suffolk by his namesake son

Drew, Charles